Bethsaida (from  from Hebrew/Aramaic  beth-tsaida, lit. "house of hunting" from the Hebrew root), also known as Julias, is a place mentioned in the New Testament. Julias lay in an administrative district known as Gaulonitis. Historians have suggested that the name is also referenced in rabbinic literature under the epithet Ṣaidan.

Etymology
In Hebrew beit means house, and tzed means both hunting and fishing. The resulting name means either "house of the fisherman" or "house of the hunter". The Hebrew Beit-tzaida, adapted to Greek phonetics (the New Testament was written in Greek) and transliterated to Latin, yields Bethsaida.

History

New Testament
In the Gospel of Mark, Jesus reportedly restored a blind man's sight at a place just outside the ancient village of Bethsaida. In , Jesus miraculously feeds five thousand near Bethsaida.

Pliny the Elder, in his Natural History, places Bethsaida on the eastern side of the Sea of Galilee. The historian Josephus says that the town of Bethsaida (at that time called Julia), was situated 120 stadia from the lake Semechonitis, not far from the Jordan River as it passes into the middle of the Sea of Galilee. De Situ Terrae Sanctae, a 6th-century account written by Theodosius the archdeacon describes Bethsaida's location in relation to Capernaum, saying that it was  distant from Capernaum. The distance between Bethsaida and Paneas is said to have been .

Although Bethsaida is believed to be located on the northern shore of the Sea of Galilee, within the Bethsaida Valley, there is disagreement among scholars as to precisely where. Since the nineteenth century, three places have been considered as the possible location of Biblical Betsaida: the Bedouin village of Messadiye; the small, deserted settlement of El-Araj (Beit HaBek, "House of the Bey"); and the archaeological site (tel) of Et-Tell. Over time, the latter two locations have come to appear more likely. While Messadiye and El-Araj are closer to the Sea of Galilee, Et-Tell shows significant archaeological remains including fragments of fishing equipment.

Archaeology
 Et-Tell, a site on the east bank of the Jordan River, is promoted by the Bethsaida Excavations Project, led by Rami Arav.
 El-Araj is proposed by a second group, led by Mordechai Aviam, under the auspices of the Center for Holy Land Studies (CHLS).

Et-Tell
Archaeologists tend to agree that the capital of the kingdom of Geshur was situated at et-Tell, a place also inhabited on a lesser scale during the first centuries BCE and CE and sometimes identified with the town of Bethsaida of New Testament fame.

The first excavations of the site were conducted in 1987–1989, by the Golan Research Institute. In 2008–2010, and in 2014, archaeological excavations of the site were conducted by Rami Arav on behalf of the University of Nebraska of Omaha, Nebraska. According to Arav, the ruin of et-Tell is said to be Bethsaida, a ruined site on the east side of the Jordan on rising ground,  from the sea. This distance poses a problem, however, insofar that if it were a fishing village, it is situated far from the shore of the Sea of Galilee. In an attempt to rectify the problem, the following hypotheses have been devised:

Tectonic rifting has uplifted et-Tell (the site is located on the Great African-Syrian Rift fault).
The water level has dropped from increased population usage, and land irrigation. In fact, the excavation of Magdala's harbor has proven that the ancient water-level was much higher than it is today.
The Jordan River delta has been extended by sedimentation.

Bronze and Iron Ages 

Excavations indicate that the settlement was founded in the 10th century BCE, in the biblical period. Et-Tell was inhabited during both the Bronze Age and the Iron Age. The fortified town there is associated by researchers with the biblical kingdom of Geshur.

Imposing archaeological finds, mainly the Stratum V city gate, date to the post-Geshurite 8th century BCE, but there are indications, as of 2016, that the archaeologists are close to locating the 10th-century BCE, that is: Geshurite, city gate as well. The et-Tell site would have been easily the largest and strongest city to the east of the Jordan Valley during the Iron Age II era.

In July 2018, a group of twenty archaeologists led by Rami Arav discovered a structure identified as a city gate. They tentatively identified the city with biblical Zer, a name used during the First Temple period.

Hellenistic and Roman periods 
Et-Tell was inhabited on a lesser scale during the first centuries BCE and CE than in the Bronze Age and Iron Ages. Archaeological excavations at site have revealed fishing gear, including lead weights used for fishing nets, as well as sewing needles for repairing fishing nets. The findings indicate that most of the city's economy was based on fishing on the Sea of Galilee. Two silver coins dating to 143 BCE, as well as Slavonic bronze coins, bronze coins from the time of Alexander Jannaeus, King of the Hasmonean dynasty (reigned c. 103-76 BCE), and one coin from the time of Philip the Tetrarch (a son of Herod the Great), ruler of the Bashan (reigned 4 BCE - 34 CE), were discovered at the site. Philip the Tetrarch applied the name "Julias" to the site, which he named after Caesar's daughter.

Al-Araj
Location: 

According to Josephus, around the year 30/31 CE (or 32/33 CE) Herod Philip II raised the village of Bethsaida in Lower Gaulanitis to the rank of a polis and renamed it "Julias," in honor of Livia, also called Julia Augusta, the wife of Augustus. It lay near the place where the Jordan enters the Sea of Galilee.

Julias/Bethsaida was a city east of the Jordan River, in a "desert place" (that is, uncultivated ground used for grazing), if this is the location to which Jesus retired by boat with his disciples to rest a while (see  and ). The multitude following on foot along the northern shore of the lake would cross the Jordan by the ford at its mouth, which is used by foot travelers to this day. The "desert" of the narrative is just the barrīyeh of the Arabs, where the animals are driven out for pasture.

In 2017, archaeologists announced the discovery of a Roman bathhouse at el-Araj, which is taken as proof that the site was a polis in the Roman Empire period. The bathhouse was located in a layer below the Byzantine layer, with an intervening layer of mud and clay that indicated a break in occupation between 250 and 350 CE. They also found what might be the remains of a Byzantine church building, matching the description of a traveller in 750 CE. On account of these discoveries, the archaeologists believe that el-Araj is now the most likely candidate for the location of Bethsaida.

In 2019, what some describe as the Church of Apostles was unearthed by the El-Araj excavations team during the fourth season at the site of Bethsaida-Julias / Beithabbak (El-Araj), on the north shore of Sea of Galilee near where the Jordan river enters the lake.
The excavation was carried out by Prof. Mordechai Aviam of Kinneret College and Prof. R. Steven Notley of Nyack College. This Byzantine period church is believed by some to have been built over the house of the apostle brothers, Peter and Andrew. Only the southern rooms of the church were excavated. A well-protected ornamental mosaic floor, gilded glass tesserae, and a marble chancel decorated with a wreath have been found in some of the excavated rooms. According to Professor Notley:

In 2022, the archaeological team uncovered a large mosaic that is over 1500 years old containing an inscription. This invokes St. Peter as "the chief and commander of the heavenly apostles,” and mentions a donor named "Constantine, a servant of Christ.” These terminologies are consistent with Byzantine usage. Because of this, Notley said that this "strengthen[s] our argument that [it] should be considered the leading candidate for first century Bethsaida."

El-Mesydiah
El-Mesydiah, also spelled el-Mes‛adīyeh is a third, but generally considered least likely possibility. It is located on the present shoreline, but preliminary excavations, including the use of ground penetrating radar, initially revealed only a small number of ruins dating from before the Byzantine period. However, the name is in origin radically different from Bethsaida. The substitution of sīn for ṣād is easy, but the insertion of the guttural ‛ain is impossible.

One or two Bethsaidas?
Many scholars  maintain that all the New Testament references to Bethsaida apply to one place, namely, Bethsaida Julias. The arguments for and against this view may be summarized as follows.

Galilee ran right round the lake, including most of the level coastland on the east. Thus Gamala, on the eastern shore, was within the jurisdiction of Josephus, who commanded in Galilee. Judas of Gamala is also called Judas of Galilee. If Gamala, far up the slope towering over the eastern shore of the sea, were in Galilee, a fortiori Bethsaida, a town which lay on the very edge of the Jordan, may be described as in Galilee.

Josephus makes it plain that Gamala, while added to his jurisdiction, was not in Galilee, but in Gaulanitis. Even if Judas were born in Gamala, and so might properly be called a Gaulanite, he may, like others, have come to be known as belonging to the province in which his active life was spent. "Jesus of Nazareth" for instance was born in Bethlehem in Judaea. Josephus also explicitly says that Bethsaida was in Lower Gaulanitis . Further, Luke places the country of the Gerasenes on the other side of the sea from Galilee (Luke 8:26) – antipéra tês Galilaías ("over against Galilee").

To go to the other side – eis tò péran (Mark 6:45) – does not of necessity imply passing from the west to the east coast of the lake, since Josephus uses the verb diaperaióō of a passage from Tiberias to Taricheae. But
this involved a passage from a point on the west to a point on the south shore, "crossing over" two considerable bays; whereas if the boat started from any point in el-Baṭeiḥah, to which we seem to be limited by the "much grass", and by the definition of the district as belonging to Bethsaida, to sail to et-Tell or el-Araj, it was a matter of coasting not more than a couple of miles, with no bay to cross.
No case can be cited where the phrase eis tò péran certainly means anything else than "to the other side".
Mark says that the boat started to go unto the other side to Bethsaida, while John, gives the direction "over the sea unto Capernaum" (John 6:17). The two towns were therefore practically in the same line. Now there is no question that Capernaum was on "the other side", nor is there any suggestion that the boat was driven out of its course; and it is quite obvious that, sailing toward Capernaum, whether at Tell Ḥūm or at Khān Minyeh, it would never reach Bethsaida Julias
The words of Mark, it is suggested, have been too strictly interpreted: as the Gospel was written probably at Rome, its author being a native, not of Galilee, but of Jerusalem. Want of precision on topographical points, therefore, need not surprise us. The agreement of these two favors the strict interpretation. Further, if the Gospel of Mark embodies the recollections of Peter, it would be difficult to find a more reliable authority for topographical details connected with the sea on which his fisher life was spent.

In support of the single-city theory it is further argued that
Jesus withdrew to Bethsaida as being in the jurisdiction of Philip, when he heard of the murder of John the Baptist by Herod Antipas, and would not have sought again the territories of the latter so soon after leaving them.
Medieval works of travel notice only one Bethsaida.
The east coast of the sea was definitely attached to Galilee in AD 84, and Ptolemy (c. 140) places Julias in Galilee. It is therefore significant that only the Fourth Gospel speaks of "Bethsaida of Galilee".
There could hardly have been two Bethsaidas so close together.

But:
The Bethsaida of medieval writers was evidently on the west of the Jordan River. If it lay on the east, it is inconceivable that none of them should have mentioned the river in this connection.
If the Gospel of John was not written until well into the 2nd century, then John the Apostle was not the same person as the author John the Evangelist. But this is a very precarious assumption. John, writing after AD 84, would hardly have used the phrase "Bethsaida of Galilee" of a place only recently attached to that province, writing, as he was, at a distance from the scene, and recalling the former familiar conditions.
In view of the frequent repetition of names in Palestine the nearness of the two Bethsaidas raises no difficulty. The abundance of fish at each place furnished a good reason for the recurrence of the name.

1217 battle 
During the Fifth Crusade, the well-mounted crusader army led by King Andrew II of Hungary defeated Sultan Al-Adil I at Bethsaida on the Jordan River on 10 November 1217. Muslim forces retreated to their fortresses and towns.

See also
The Sea of Galilee Boat
New Testament places associated with Jesus
Woes to the unrepentant cities

References

Bibliography

Further reading
 Arav R and RA Freund (2004) Bethsaida: A City by the North Shore of the Sea of Galilee Truman State University. .
 Bethsaida: An Ancient Fishing Village on the shore of the Sea of Galilee , 2001, Israel Ministry of Foreign Affairs.
 International Standard Bible Encyclopedia

External links
 Bethsaida, Jacqueline Schaalje
"Archaeologists discover lost home of Jesus's Apostles" by Benyamin Cohen, The Grapevine, August 7, 2017

 
Populated places established in the 10th century BC
Populated places disestablished in the 8th century
1987 archaeological discoveries
New Testament cities
New Testament Aramaic words and phrases
Fishing communities
Ancient Jewish settlements of Galilee
Ancient Jewish settlements of the Golan Heights
Disputed Biblical places
Sea of Galilee